The Hallstatt Lecture is an hour-long lecture in any European language on some aspect of ancient and modern Celtic culture. It is given at The Tabernacle, Machynlleth in Wales at lunchtime on the Wednesday of each Machynlleth Festival.

Past lecturers

 1991 Professor J. E. Caerwyn Williams
 1992 Morfydd Owen
 1993 Emeritus Professor Dafydd Jenkins 
 1994 Frank Delaney
 1995 Unknown
 1996 John Meirion Morris
 1997 Gwynn ap Gwilym
 1998 Graham and Ann Arnold
 1999 Trevor Fishlock 
 2000 Murray Chapman
 2001 Dr Marion Loffler
 2002 Simon Jenkins
 2003 Professor Alistair Crawford
 2004 Dr Damian Walford Davies
 2005 Derec Llwyd Morgan

Further reading
 Gwynn ap Gwilym: Our Cousins' Verse: connections between some Welsh and Irish poets in the early twentieth century (Hallstatt Lecture). Machynlleth Tabernacle Trust, Machynlleth, 1997 
 Trevor Fishlock: Invitation to a Mystery (Hallstatt Lecture). Machynlleth Tabernacle Trust, Machynlleth, 1999

External links
 The Machynlleth Festival 

British lecture series
Festivals in Wales
Linguistic research